The State House (formerly known as the Government House) is the official residence of the President of Fiji.

History
The present Georgian mansion was built in 1928 to replace the original building - the residence of the colonial governor - which burnt to the ground after being struck by lightning in 1921. The first Government House was built in the early 1880s (after the capital moved in Suva) that consisted of two small wood-frame buildings.

From 1970 to 1987, Government House was the official residence of the Governor-General, and became the presidential residence in 1987 after two military coups resulted in the proclamation of a republic.

Location
The residence is located south of Fiji Museum, with the main entrance on Queen Elizabeth Drive, near the Great Council of Chiefs complex.

The building is closed to the public, but a highlight of tourist visits to Suva is the changing of the guard ceremony during the first week of each month. The guards are staffed by members of the Republic of Fiji Military Forces.

The building should not be confused with the Government Buildings to the north on the same street (Victoria Parade).

Gallery

See also

Government Houses of the British Empire

References

Buildings and structures in Suva
Government buildings in Fiji
Government buildings completed in 1928
Houses completed in 1928
Government Houses of the British Empire and Commonwealth
Presidential residences